The high jump at the World Championships in Athletics has been contested by both men and women since the inaugural edition in 1983. The competition format typically has one qualifying round contested by two groups of athletes, with all those clearing the qualifying height or placing in top twelve advancing to the final round. In the 2015 World Championships in Athletics the qualifying height for men was 2.31 m and for women 1.94 m.

The championship records for the event are 2.41 m for men, set by Bohdan Bondarenko in 2013, and 2.09 m for women, set by Stefka Kostadinova in 1987.

Age
All information from IAAF

Medalists

Men

Multiple medalists

Medals by country

Women

Multiple medalists

Medals by country

References

Bibliography

External links
Official IAAF website

 
World Championships in Athletics
Events at the World Athletics Championships